Wentworth is an unincorporated community, in the town of Amnicon, Douglas County, Wisconsin, United States.

The community is located 16 miles east of the city of Superior.

U.S. Highway 2 serves as a main route in the community.

References

Unincorporated communities in Douglas County, Wisconsin
Unincorporated communities in Wisconsin